In Twenty20 cricket, Western Australia (nicknamed the Warriors) played 31 matches between 2006 and 2011, all in the KFC Twenty20 Big Bash. The team made its Twenty20 debut in the 2005–06 competition. Western Australia finished second in the 2007–08 competition, qualifying them for the 2008 Champions League Twenty20 in India, which was later canceled due to political unrest. After the 2010–11 season, the competition was replaced by the Big Bash League, with Western Australia replaced by the Perth Scorchers franchise. Although the team is currently defunct, in total, 44 players represented Western Australia at Twenty20 cricket.

Key

List of players
Statistics are correct as of 15 June 2013, and include only Twenty20 matches played for Western Australia:

See also
List of Western Australia first-class cricketers
List of Western Australia List A cricketers

References

Western Australia, Twenty20
Western Australia, Twenty20

Western Australia, Twenty20